Di Jun also known as Emperor Jun is one of the ancient supreme deities of China, now known primarily through five chapters of the Shanhaijing (Yang 2005, 97). Di Jun had two wives, or consorts: Xihe and Changxi, and Di Jun figures in several stories from Chinese mythology. One of the famous myths in which Di Jun appears is that of the archer Houyi, to whom he gave a bow and arrows (Birrell 1993, 314). Di Jun is also associated with the agricultural arts, either directly or as the progenitor of other innovators of farming practice, including especially his son, Houji, the Zhou ancestor (Yang 2005, 98). Some scholars identify Di Jun and Di Ku as variations from a shared original source (Yang 2005, 100).

See also
Chinese mythology
Di Ku
Five Grains
Horse in Chinese mythology
Houyi
Shujun

References
Birrell, Anne (1993). Chinese Mythology. (Baltimore: Johns Hopkins). 
Yang, Lihui, et al. (2005). Handbook of Chinese Mythology. New York: Oxford University Press. 

Chinese gods
Agriculture in China